The Secretary of State of the U.S. state of Georgia is an elected official with a wide variety of responsibilities, including supervising elections and maintaining public records.

The office has had a four-year term since 1946. Before 1880, the secretary of state was elected by the Georgia Assembly, not in a popular election.

List of secretaries of state of Georgia

(a) Died in office

See also
 Georgia Attorney General

References

External links
Secretary of State Official site
New Georgia Encyclopedia
Recent History of Elections for Secretary of State at OurCampaigns.com

 
Lists of Georgia (U.S. state) politicians
1777 establishments in Georgia (U.S. state)